Chardeh may refer to:
 Dibaj, a city in Semnan Province, Iran
 Chadeh, a village in South Khorasan Province, Iran